American Bang was an American southern rock band from Nashville, Tennessee. The group was founded by two former members of Llama and one of the Kicks, along with a fourth member, in 2005. They initially formed under the name Bang Bang Bang and self-released an album under this name in 2005, but after signing to Warner Bros. Records in 2006, they changed their name to American Bang after finding out another band of the same name already existed. Their first EP under the new name arrived in 2007, and a new full-length was issued in 2010. Their song "Wild and Young" was the theme song of WWE's show WWE NXT. It was also used in the 2010 animated film Alpha and Omega and in the season one finale of the television show Greek.

The band's lead guitarist, Ben Brown has now left, and the remaining trio have formed a similar band called The Cadillac Three.

Members
Ben Brown - lead guitar
Neil Mason - drums
Jaren Johnston - vocals, guitar
Kelby Ray - bass, backing vocals

Discography

Studio albums
I Shot the King (2005) [released under the band name Bang Bang Bang]
American Bang (Reprise, 2010)

Extended plays
Move to the Music EP (2007)

Singles

References

Rock music groups from Tennessee
Musical groups from Nashville, Tennessee
Warner Records artists